Nicole Vaidišová was the defending champion, but chose not to participate that year.

Anabel Medina Garrigues won the title, defeating Amélie Mauresmo in the final 6–4, 4–6, 6–4.

Seeds

Draw

Finals

Top half

Bottom half

References

External links
Draws

2007 Internationaux de Strasbourg Singles
Internationaux de Strasbourg Singles
2007 in French tennis